"Sir Hereward and Mister Fitz Go to War Again" is a 2007 fantasy novelette by Garth Nix.

Background
"Sir Hereward and Mister Fitz Go to War Again" was first published in 2007 in the April 2007 edition of Jim Baen's Universe, edited by Mike Resnick and Eric Flint and published by Baen Publishing.
 In 2008 it was republished in Fantasy: The Best of the Year: 2008 Edition edited by Rich Horton, Year's Best Fantasy 8 edited by David G. Hartwell and Kathryn Cramer, The Best of Jim Baen's Universe II edited by Eric Flint and Mike Resnick, and in The Year's Best Fantasy and Horror 2008: Twenty-First Annual Collection edited by Kelly Link, Gavin J. Grant, Ellen Datlow. "Sir Hereward and Mister Fitz Go to War Again" won the 2007 Aurealis Award for best fantasy short story and was a short-list nominee for the 2008 Ditmar Award for best novella but lost to Cat Sparks' "A Lady of Adestan". In 2008 Nix wrote a sequel to the story, "Beyond the Sea Gate of the Scholar-Pirates of Sarsköe".

Synopsis

References

2007 short stories
Australian short stories
Fantasy short stories
Works originally published in American magazines
Works originally published in fantasy fiction magazines
Works originally published in science fiction magazines
Works originally published in online magazines
Aurealis Award-winning works